In molecular biology, the sulfonylurea receptors (SUR) are membrane proteins which are the molecular targets of the sulfonylurea class of antidiabetic drugs whose mechanism of action is to promote insulin release from pancreatic beta cells.  More specifically, SUR proteins are subunits of the inward-rectifier potassium ion channels Kir6.x (6.1 and 6.2).  The association of four Kir6.x and four SUR subunits form an ion conducting channel commonly referred to as the KATP channel.

Three forms of the sulfonylurea receptor are known, SUR1 encoded by the ABCC8 gene, and SUR2A and SUR2B, which are splice variants arising from a single ABCC9 gene.

Function 
The primary function of the sulfonylurea receptor is to sense intracellular levels of the nucleotides ATP and ADP and in response facilitate the open or closing its associated Kir6.x potassium channel. Hence, the KATP channel monitors the energy balance within the cell.

Depending on the tissue in which the KATP channel is expressed, altering the membrane potential can trigger a variety of downstream events. For example, in pancreatic beta cells, high levels of glucose lead to increased production of ATP, which, in turn, binds to the KATP channel resulting in channel closure. The relative depolarization (decrease in membrane  hyperpolarization), in turn, opens voltage-dependent calcium channels increasing intracellular calcium concentrations, which triggers exocytosis of insulin.

Under cerebral ischemic conditions, SUR1, the regulatory subunit of the KATP and the NCCa-ATP channels, is expressed in neurons, astrocytes, oligodendrocytes, endothelial cells and by reactive microglia. Blockade of SUR1 receptors with glibenclamide has been involved in improved outcome in animal stroke models and investigational human studies by preventing brain swelling and enhancing neuroprotection.

Tissue distribution
The isoforms of the sulfonylurea receptor have the following tissue distribution:
 Adipose tissue - SUR2B/Kir6.1
 Pancreatic beta cells - SUR1/Kir6.2
 Cardiac myocytes - SUR2A
 Skeletal muscle - SUR2A
 Smooth muscle - SUR2B
 Brain - SUR1, SUR2A and SUR2B

Disease linkage
The SUR1 protein is coded by the ABCC8 gene and is associated with congenital hyperinsulinism and susceptibility to type 2 diabetes.

References